The Dijiu Suspension Bridge is a pedestrian suspension bridge in Fanlu Township, Chiayi County, Taiwan. It crosses the Bazhang River.

History
The bridge was constructed in 1937.

Transportation
The bridge is accessible by bus from Chiayi Station of Taiwan Railways.

See also
 List of bridges in Taiwan

References

1937 establishments in Taiwan
Bridges completed in 1937
Suspension bridges in Chiayi County
Tourist attractions in Chiayi County